Cujo is a 1981 horror novel by American writer Stephen King about a rabid Saint Bernard. The novel won the British Fantasy Award in 1982 and was made into a film in 1983.

Background
Cujo's name was based on the alias of Willie Wolfe, one of the men responsible for orchestrating Patty Hearst's kidnapping and indoctrination into the Symbionese Liberation Army. Stephen King discusses Cujo in On Writing, referring to it as a novel he "barely remembers writing at all." King wrote the book during the height of his struggle with alcohol addiction. King goes on to say he likes the book and wishes he could remember enjoying the good parts as he put them on the page.

According to King, the novel was partly inspired by his trip to a mechanic during the spring of 1977. In a 2006 interview with The Paris Review, King describes how issues with his motorcycle led him to visit an auto shop on the northern outskirts of Bridgton, Maine. He claims his motorcycle died when he arrived at the shop, and moments after, a Saint Bernard emerged from the garage, growling at him and eventually lunging for his hand. Although the mechanic stopped the dog from harming King by hitting the dog's hindquarters with a wrench, King was still startled by the encounter. This incident, as well as a story published in a Portland, Maine, newspaper about a young child who was killed by a Saint Bernard, provided inspiration for the novel. King also owned a dysfunctional Ford Pinto at the time, which is the same car model the novel's protagonist, Donna Trenton, drives to the auto garage where she encounters the rabid Cujo.

Plot
In the summer of 1980, the middle-class Trentons have recently moved to the fictional town of Castle Rock, Maine from New York City with their four-year-old son, Tad. Donna Trenton has recently had an affair with a local man named Steve Kemp. After Donna ends the relationship, Steve spitefully reveals the affair to her husband, Vic Trenton. In the midst of this household tension, Vic's advertising agency, Ad Worx, is failing due to a scandal over a cereal called Red Razberry Zingers. Vic is forced to travel out of town, leaving Tad and Donna at home alone. 

The blue-collar Cambers are longtime residents of Castle Rock. Joe Camber is a mechanic who dominates and abuses his wife, Charity, and their ten-year-old son, Brett. Charity wins a $5,000 lottery prize, and uses the proceeds to bargain with Joe to finally allow her to take Brett on a trip to visit Charity's sister in Connecticut and show him the possibility of a better life. Joe acquiesces and secretly plans to take a pleasure trip to Boston with his friend, alcoholic Gary Pervier. 

While the Cambers are getting ready for their trips, their dog Cujo, a large, good-natured Saint Bernard, chases a rabbit in the nearby fields and inserts his head in the entrance to a small cave. A bat bites him on the nose and infects him with rabies, against which Cujo is not vaccinated. Charity and Brett leave town, though Brett suspects Cujo is sick. Cujo then kills Gary in his home. After Joe discovers the body, Cujo kills him as well.

Donna, with Tad, takes their failing Ford Pinto to Joe for repairs. The car breaks down in the Cambers' dooryard, and as Donna attempts to find Joe, Cujo appears and attacks her. She is able to get back in the car, but Donna and Tad are trapped when Cujo continues to stalk and attack them. The interior of the car becomes increasingly hot in the summer sun. During one escape attempt, Donna is bitten in the stomach and leg, but manages to escape back into the car. She plans to run for the house but abandons the idea because she fears the door will be locked and that she will be subsequently killed by Cujo, leaving Tad alone. Tad becomes catatonic with fear and begins to have seizures.

Steve Kemp goes to the Trenton home to attack Donna, then ransacks it when he finds it empty. Vic returns to Castle Rock after several failed attempts to contact Donna. The police suspect Steve Kemp of kidnapping Donna and Tad. To explore all leads, the state police send Castle Rock Sheriff George Bannerman out to the Cambers' house, but Cujo attacks and kills him. Donna, after witnessing the attack and realizing Tad is in danger of dying of dehydration after days in the car, battles the weakened Cujo and kills him with a baseball bat. Vic arrives on the scene, having remembered the broken car, as the fight ends, but finds Tad has already died from dehydration and heatstroke. The authorities pull a distraught Donna from Tad's body and take her to the hospital. A veterinarian removes Cujo's head for a biopsy to check for rabies prior to the cremation of his remains. Charity receives a phone call and learns of Cujo's rampage and her husband's death.

Several months later both the Trenton and Camber families are trying to move on with their lives. Donna has completed her treatment for rabies and her injuries. The Trentons' marrriage has survived, as well as Vic's business, and they mourn Tad together. Charity, now working in order to support herself and Brett, gives Brett a new, vaccinated puppy. A postscript says that the hole Cujo chased the rabbit into was never discovered. It also reminds the reader that Cujo was a good dog who always tried to keep his owners happy, but the ravage of rabies drove him to violence.

Characters 
 Cujo: a friendly Saint Bernard that becomes murderous after contracting rabies from a bat bite.
 Donna Trenton: wife of Vic Trenton. She becomes trapped in the car after arriving at the auto shop where the rabid Cujo lurks.
 Vic Trenton: Donna's husband. He is on a work-related trip when his wife and son encounter Cujo at the Camber auto shop.
 Tad Trenton: son of Donna and Vic. He becomes trapped in the car with Donna at the auto shop.
 Gary Pervier: the next-door neighbor and poker buddy of Joe Camber. A sixty-year-old WW2 army veteran and an alcoholic. He is the first victim of Cujo.
 Joe Camber: mechanic and owner of the auto shop where Donna and Tad encounter Cujo.
 Charity Camber: wife of Joe Camber. She and her son leave Cujo behind while on a trip to visit Charity's sister.
 Brett Camber: son of Joe and Charity. Cujo is Brett's dog.
 Frank Dodd: a former Castle Rock police officer who was discovered to be the "Castle Rock Strangler", a serial killer traumatizing Castle Rock during the 1970s (see The Dead Zone). Cujo makes many references to Dodd throughout the story.
 George Bannerman: the current Castle Rock sheriff. He once worked with Dodd and discovered Dodd's guilt in the Castle Rock murders. He is killed by Cujo in his attempt to save Donna and Tad.
 Steve Kemp: The man with whom Donna has had an affair. He breaks into and vandalizes Donna's house after learning she wants to end the affair.
 Roger Breakstone: Vic's friend and business partner. He accompanies Vic on his work-related trip.

Critical reception
Upon its initial release in 1981, the novel earned and maintained a high position on bestseller lists in the United States. Some critics have criticized the novel for its ending. The 1983 film adaptation of the novel featured a more optimistic conclusion.

Cujo received the following accolades:

 Locus Award Nominee for Best Fantasy Novel (1982)
 Balrog Award Nominee for Best Novel (1982)
 British Fantasy Award for Best Novel (August Derleth Fantasy Award) (1982)

Despite the above, according to the American Library Association, Cujo was the 49th most banned and challenged book in the United States between 1990 and 1999.

Allusions and connections to other King novels 

 There are allusions to Cujo in King's other works, which often reference the Saint Bernard and refer generally to the incident of the summer of 1980 when the rabid dog killed three people in Castle Rock, Maine.
 On the official Stephen King website, Cujo is listed as a character in numerous other novels, including Needful Things, The Body, The Dark Half, and Pet Sematary.

References

External links
Stephen King.com: Cujo

1981 American novels
Adultery in novels
American horror novels
American novels adapted into films
Fictional dogs
Fiction set in 1980
Novels about mental health
Novels by Stephen King
Novels set in Maine
Rabies in popular culture
Viking Press books
Novels about dogs
Third-person narrative novels